Mureck ( archaic: Cmürek) is a municipality in the district of Südoststeiermark in the Austrian state of Styria. Administrative reforms in Styria led to the merging on 1 January 2015 of the formerly separate municipalities of Mureck, Gosdorf, and Eichfeld, which includes the villages of Hainsdorf-Brunnsee and Oberrakitsch. The new municipality is named Mureck.

Geography 
Mureck is situated in the south of Styria, on the border with Slovenia.

Constituent parts of Mureck municipality 
The municipality comprises the communities of:
 Diepersdorf (pop. 138)
 Eichfeld (349)
 Fluttendorf (59)
 Gosdorf (574)
 Hainsdorf-Brunnsee (209)
 Misselsdorf (388)
 Mureck (1570)
 Oberrakitsch (334)

Name
The name Mureck was first attested in 1151 as Mŏrekke (and as Murekke in 1181, Můrekke in 1183, and Muregk in 1500). The name is a compound of Mur 'Mur River' + Old High German ecke 'edge, bend' or egge 'hill' (sometimes 'fortification'), and thus means 'bend on the Mur River' or 'hill/fortification on the Mur River'. The Slovene name Cmurek is borrowed from the Middle High German prepositional phrase ze Murekke, literally 'at Mureck'. For similar Slovene geographical names based on foreign-language prepositional phrases of location, compare Crngrob, Cven, Dragonja, Sostro, and Spuhlja.

Population

Events 

 Weckruf: since 1954 the local marching band Grenzlandtrachtenkapelle Mureck has performed the so-called wakening call (in German, Weckruf) each May 1, waking every friend of brass-band music with marching music in the early morning hours. Until 1964 all of this happened by foot; later the band started using a nicely restored truck.

Clubs and organisations

Marching bands 
 Grenzlandtrachtenkapelle Mureck

Fire departments 
 FF Eichfeld
 FF Gosdorf
 FF Hainsdorf-Brunnsee
 FF Misselsdorf
 FF Mureck
 FF Oberrakitsch

Sports clubs 
 Beachvolleyballclub
 ESV Mureck
 TUS Mureck

Charity and service clubs 
 Leo Club South Styrian Unity
 Lions Club Bad Radkersburg-Mureck

International relations

Twin towns — sister cities
Mureck is twinned with:
  Lenauheim, Romania

References

Cities and towns in Südoststeiermark District